There are 38 buildings and structures listed as Grade I by Historic England in the city of Salisbury, Wiltshire, England.

Twenty-one are within the Cathedral Close. Elsewhere there are:
 3 churches
 2 residences
 2 inns
 6 buildings that had an institutional or community use when constructed
 3 river bridges
 an ancient ruin.

|}

See also 

 List of Grade I listed buildings in Wiltshire

Notes

Salisbury
Buildings and structures in Salisbury
Lists of Grade I listed buildings in Wiltshire
Grade I listed buildings in Salisbury